Qualification was done at the 2010 Pan American Championship in Guatemala City, Guatemala. A maximum of sixty athletes will compete at the squash competition. There will be a maximum of 35 male and 25 female competitors total. Each nation can enter a maximum of three male and female athletes, for a total of six athletes. Of these athletes, two will compete in the individual events per gender, one pair will compete in doubles per gender, and three will compete in a team in the team event per gender. The top seven nations at the 2010 Pan American Squash Championship can qualify women's teams, while the top ten nations can qualify men's teams. Mexico qualifies a men's and women's team as the host nation. Outside of this, athletes can qualify individually, with a maximum of one female and two male athletes qualifying individually.

Qualification summary

Men

Top ten excluding Mexico (who won the Pan American Championship).

Women

Top seven excluding Mexico (who finished third at the Pan American Championship).

References 

P
Qualification for the 2011 Pan American Games